Cannon County is a county located in the U.S. state of Tennessee. As of the 2020 census, the population was 14,506. Its county seat is Woodbury. Cannon County is part of the Nashville–Davidson–Murfreesboro–Franklin, TN Metropolitan Statistical Area.

History
Cannon County was established by the Tennessee state legislature on January 31, 1836. It was formed from portions of Rutherford, Smith, Wilson, and Warren counties and was named for Governor Newton Cannon. This was part of the Middle Tennessee region, with mixed farming and livestock raising, including of thoroughbred horses.

Geography

Adjacent counties
DeKalb County (northeast)
Warren County (east)
Coffee County (south)
Rutherford County (west)
Wilson County (northwest)

State protected areas
Headwaters Wildlife Management Area
Short Mountain State Natural Area

Demographics

2020 census

As of the 2020 United States census, there were 14,506 people, 5,488 households, and 3,903 families residing in the county.

2000 census
As of the census of 2000, there were 12,826 people, 4,998 households, and 3,643 families residing in the county.  The population density was 48 people per square mile (19/km2).  There were 5,420 housing units at an average density of 20 per square mile (8/km2).  The racial makeup of the county was 96.87% White, 1.46% Black or African American, 0.33% Native American, 0.12% Asian, 0.02% Pacific Islander, 0.40% from other races, and 0.81% from two or more races.  1.22% of the population were Hispanic or Latino of any race.

There were 4,998 households, out of which 33.30% had children under the age of 18 living with them, 58.60% were married couples living together, 9.90% had a female householder with no husband present, and 27.10% were non-families. 24.30% of all households were made up of individuals, and 10.90% had someone living alone who was 65 years of age or older.  The average household size was 2.53 and the average family size was 2.99.

In the county, the population was spread out, with 25.40% under the age of 18, 8.30% from 18 to 24, 28.90% from 25 to 44, 23.70% from 45 to 64, and 13.70% who were 65 years of age or older.  The median age was 37 years. For every 100 females, there were 96.30 males.  For every 100 females age 18 and over, there were 93.20 males.

The median income for a household in the county was $32,809, and the median income for a family was $38,424. Males had a median income of $28,659 versus $21,489 for females. The per capita income for the county was $16,405.  About 9.60% of families and 12.80% of the population were below the poverty line, including 14.00% of those under age 18 and 17.80% of those age 65 or over.

Government
The policy-making and legislative authority in Cannon County is vested in the Board of County Commissioners.  Commissioners are elected to four-year terms by a simple majority of the residents in their district.  Each district has two commissioners, and all ten seats are up for election at the same time.  Commissioners set personnel policies for the county, appropriate funds for county departments, and set the property tax rate.  The county mayor typically serves as chair of the County Commission and breaks a tie if one occurs during voting.  Members typically meet in January, April, July and October with special call meetings taking place when necessary.

County officials:
 County Executive: Brent Bush
 Sessions Court Judge: Susan Melton
 Circuit Court Clerk: Katina George
 County Clerk: Lana Jones
 Clerk & Master: Dana Davenport
 Register of Deeds: Sandy Hollandsworth 
 Property Assessor: Angela Schwartz
 Trustee: Norma Knox
 Sheriff: Darrell Young
 Constable 1st District: None
 Constable 2nd District: Charles Nokes
 Constable 3rd District: None
 Constable 4th District: None
 Constable 5th District: None

Each official is elected to a four-year term. With the exception of the tax assessor, the terms of most of the officials above will end on September 1, 2022.  The tax assessor's term will end on September 1, 2020.  The general sessions judge is elected to an eight-year term, and the clerk and master is appointed to a six-year term by the chancellor.

Board of County Commissioners (2018–2022)
Each district is represented by two commissioners.

District 1 (Readyville and parts of Bradyville and Woodbury):
 Jeannine Floyd (member since 2018)
 James Russell Reed (member since 2010)

District 2 (Auburntown, Gassaway and parts of Short Mountain):
 Corey Davenport (member since 2018) 
 Karen Ashford (member since 2014)

District 3 (Woodland, Bradyville and parts of Woodbury):
 Jim Bush (member since 2010) 
 Greg Mitchell (member since 2017)

District 4 (Eastside, part of Short Mountain, Sunny Slope, and parts of Woodbury):
 Brent Brandon (member since 2018)
 Randy Gannon (member since 2018)

District 5 (city limits of Woodbury):
 Kim Davenport (member since 2018)
 Ronnie Mahaffey (member since 2018)

Election results

Education
Beginning with the 2022–2023 school year, Auburn, East Side, and Short Mountain schools were closed. West Side, Woodbury Grammar, and Woodland schools were renamed Cannon North Elementary, Cannon County Elementary, and Cannon South Elementary, respectively, and house grades PreK–5. A new middle school, Cannon County Middle (grades 6–8), was housed temporarily with Cannon County Elementary.

The Cannon County School District operates five schools:

 Cannon County High School, Woodbury (9–12)
 Cannon County Middle School, Woodbury (6–8) – Opened in 2022
 Cannon North Elementary School (formerly West Side School, PreK–8), Readyville (PreK–5) – Renamed in 2022
 Cannon County Elementary School (formerly Woodbury Grammar School, PreK–8), Woodbury (PreK–5) – Renamed in 2022
 Cannon South Elementary School (formerly Woodland School, PreK–8), Bradyville (PreK–5) – Opened in 1955, renamed in 2022

Three elementary schools were closed during consolidation after the 2021–2022 school year:
 Auburn School, Auburntown (K–8) – Closed in 2022
 East Side Elementary School, Woodbury (K–8) – Closed in 2022
 Short Mountain Elementary School, Woodbury (K–8) – Opened in 1955, closed in 2022

Future
Long-term plans call for construction of a new Cannon County Middle School building, as well as the closure of Cannon North and Cannon South by 2025.

Communities

Towns
 Auburntown
 Woodbury (county seat)

Unincorporated communities

 Bluewing
 Bradyville
 Gassaway
 Hopewell
 Iconium
 Midway
 Readyville
 Sugar Tree Knob

See also
National Register of Historic Places listings in Cannon County, Tennessee

References

External links

 Cannon County Official website
Chamber of Commerce
 TNGenWeb 
 Cannon County on  FamilySearch Wiki.

 
1836 establishments in Tennessee
Populated places established in 1836
Nashville metropolitan area
Middle Tennessee
Counties of Appalachia